Negociaré con la pena is the first EP recorded by American singer-songwriter Pepe Aguilar.

Negociaré con la pena reached number 27 on the Billboard Top Latin Albums chart and number 19 on the Billboard Regional Mexican Albums chart in the United States. It was certified gold in Mexico. The recording received a Latin Grammy nomination for Best Traditional Pop Album at the 13th Annual Latin Grammy Awards in 2012.

Reception 

Alex Henderson of Allmusic gave the album 3.5 stars; he described it as "enjoyable". The recording received a Latin Grammy nomination for Best Traditional Pop Album at the 13th Annual Latin Grammy Awards in 2012, but lost to David Bisbal's Una Noche en el Teatro Real.

Commercial release 
Negociaré con la pena reached number 27 on the Billboard Top Latin Albums chart and number 19 on the Billboard Regional Mexican Albums chart in the United States. It was certified gold by the Asociación Mexicana de Productores de Fonogramas y Videogramas in Mexico.

Track listing

Charts

Weekly charts

Certifications

References 

2011 EPs
Spanish-language EPs
Latin pop EPs
Pepe Aguilar albums